The following is a timeline of the history of the city of Kassel, Germany.

Prior to 19th century

 1462 - Martinskirche, Kassel (church) built.
 1502 -  (orchestra) founded.
 1593 -  built.
 1594 - Printer Wilhelm Wessel in business.
 1606 - Ottoneum (theatre) built.
 1626 - Population: 6,329.(de)
 1709 - Collegium Carolinum (Kassel) (school) founded.
 1710 - Karlskirche (Kassel) (church) built.
 1731 - Casselische Zeitung von Policey (newspaper) begins publication.
 1761 - Siege of Cassel (1761): Cassel successfully defended by the French.
 1762 - Siege of Cassel (1762): Cassel was captured by the Germans from the French.
 1767 -  (square) laid out.
 1768 -  (square) laid out.
 1777 - Art school established.
 1779 - Fridericianum museum opens.
 1798 - Schloss Wilhelmshöhe (palace) built.

19th century
 1807 - Became the capital of the Kingdom of Westphalia.
 1810 - Population: 23,068.(de)
 1813 - Bombarded and captured by the Russian general Chernichev;
 1836 - Verein für Naturkunde (society) founded.
 1848 - Kassel–Warburg railway begins operating.
 1850/51 - Occupied by the Prussians.
 1866
 Prussian XI Army Corps headquartered in Kassel.
 Kassel becomes seat of province Hesse-Nassau in Prussia.
 1877 - Steam tram begins operating.
 1880 - Population: 58,290.
 1885 - Population: 64,083.
 1895 - Population: 81,752.
 1899 -  becomes part of Kassel.
 1900 - Population: 106,034.

20th century
 1905 - Population: 120,446.
 1909
 Neue Hoftheater (theatre) built.
 Population: 150,577.(de)
 1914 -  built.
 1926 - Gutsbezirk Fasanenhof becomes part of Kassel.
 1928 - Gutsbezirk Oberförsterei Kirchditmold, Kragenhof, Oberförsterei Ehlen, and  become part of Kassel.
 1936
 , Niederzwehren, and  become part of Kassel.
 Population: 203,418.(de)
 1939 - Nazi camp for Sinti and Romani people established (see also Porajmos).
 1942 - Bombing of Kassel in World War II begins.
 1943 - July: Kassel-Druseltal subcamp of the Buchenwald concentration camp established. The prisoners were mostly Poles and Russians.
 1944 - October: Several prisoners escaped from the Kassel-Druseltal subcamp of Buchenwald.
 1945
 29 March: Kassel-Druseltal subcamp of Buchenwald dissolved. Escape of many prisoners during their deportation to the main Buchenwald camp.
 1–4 April: Battle of Kassel (1945); Allied forces win.
 Hessischen Nachrichten newspaper begins publication.
 1955
 National  (garden show) held in Kassel.
 "Documenta" quinquennial art exhibition begins.

 1959 - Staatstheater Kassel built.
 1960
 Kassel Hauptbahnhof (train station) rebuilt.
  opens.
 1971 - University of Kassel established.
 1972 - Kassel (district) formed in the state of Hesse.
 1976 - New Gallery (Kassel) opens.
 1977 - Eissporthalle Kassel (ice rink) opens.
 1981 - National  (garden show) held in Kassel.
 1985 - Population: 184,466.(de)

21st century

 2005
  (square) remodelled.
  becomes mayor.
 2007
 Kassel RegioTram begins operating.
 Kassel Marathon begins.
 2013 -  opens.
 2014 -  built.
 2015 - Population: 200,507.(de)

See also
 
  (city archives)
 History of Hesse
Other cities in the state of Hesse:(de)
 Timeline of Frankfurt

ReferencesThis article incorporates information from the German Wikipedia.''

Bibliography

in English

in German
 
 
 
  (bibliography)

External links

 Items related to Kassel, various dates (via Europeana)
 Items related to Kassel, various dates (via Digital Public Library of America)

Kassel
History of Kassel
kassel